Hart is a given name. Notable people with the name include:

 Hart Bochner (born 1956), Canadian actor, screenwriter, director, and producer
 Hart Crane (1899–1932), American poet
 Hart Pease Danks (1834–1903), American musician
 Hart D. Fisher, American author and writer
 Hart Hanson (born 1957), Canadian writer and producer
 Hart Pomerantz, 20th-century Canadian lawyer and television personality

See also
 Hart
 Hart (surname)
 Hart (sultan)